Watson syndrome is an autosomal dominant condition characterized by Lisch nodules of the ocular iris, axillary/inguinal freckling, pulmonary valvular stenosis, relative macrocephaly, short stature, and neurofibromas. Watson syndrome is allelic to NF1, the same gene associated with neurofibromatosis type 1.

See also 
 Westerhof syndrome
 List of cutaneous conditions

References

External links 

Genodermatoses
Rare syndromes